John Frederick Knott OBE FRS FREng (9 December 1938 – 5 October 2017) was an English metallurgist and materials scientist.

From 1962 to 1966, Knott was a Research Officer at the Central Electricity Research Laboratories in Leatherhead in Surrey, after which he became a lecturer in the Department of Materials, Science and Metallurgy at Cambridge University between 1967 and 1981. In 1990, he moved to the University of Birmingham, where he was Professor and Head of the School of Metallurgy and Materials until 1996, Dean of Engineering from 1995 to 1998 and the fifth Feeney Professor of Physical Metallurgy between 1994 and 2007.

He was elected a Fellow of the Royal Society (FRS) in 1990 and was awarded their Leverhulme Medal in 2005 "for his distinguished contributions to the quantitative scientific understanding of fracture processes in metals and alloys and its engineering applications". He was elected in 1988 as a Fellow of the Royal Academy of Engineering.

He died on 5 October 2017 at the age of 78.

References 

1938 births
2017 deaths
People from Bristol
British metallurgists
Academics of the University of Birmingham
Fellows of the Royal Society
Officers of the Order of the British Empire